Jean Gruault (3 August 1924 – 8 June 2015) was a French screenwriter and actor. He wrote 25 films between 1960 and 1995. He was nominated for an Academy Award for Academy Award for Best Original Screenplay for the 1980 film Mon oncle d'Amérique.

Selected filmography
 Paris Belongs to Us (1960)
 Vanina Vanini (1961)
 Jules et Jim (1962)
 The Nun (1966)
 Two English Girls (1971)
 The Story of Adèle H. (1975)
 Mon oncle d'Amérique (1980)
 Via degli specchi (1982)

References

External links

1924 births
2015 deaths
People from Fontenay-sous-Bois
French male screenwriters
French screenwriters
French New Wave
20th-century French dramatists and playwrights
French film producers
French male stage actors